Ali Hassan; born 4 June 1964) is a Mozambican footballer. He played in five matches for the Mozambique national football team from 1989 to 1996. He was also named in Mozambique's squad for the 1996 African Cup of Nations tournament.

References

1964 births
Living people
Mozambican footballers
Mozambique international footballers
1996 African Cup of Nations players
Place of birth missing (living people)
Association footballers not categorized by position